Garner is a town in Wake County, North Carolina, United States and a suburb of Raleigh. The population is 31,159 as of the 2020 Census. The city limits are entirely within Wake County, though portions of unincorporated Wake County, as well as the Cleveland community in northern Johnston County,  have Garner mailing addresses. It is part of the Research Triangle region of North Carolina and serves as a bedroom community for the region.

Geography
Garner is located at  (35.698243, -78.622865).

Garner is located entirely within Wake County.  There are unincorporated areas of Wake County and Johnston County that have Garner postal addresses, including a portion of the unincorporated, but densely populated, Cleveland Community.

Demographics

2020 census

As of the 2020 United States census, there were 31,159 people, 11,642 households, and 7,637 families residing in the town.

2000 census
As of the census of 2000, there were 17,757 people, 6,950 households, and 4,830 families residing in the town. The population density was 1,385.1 people per square mile (534.8/km). There were 7,252 housing units at an average density of 565.7 per square mile (218.4/km). The racial makeup of the town was 67.02% White, 27.13% African American, 0.41% Native American, 1.11% Asian, 0.02% Pacific Islander, 2.77% from other races, and 1.54% from two or more races. Hispanic or Latino of any race were 4.75% of the population.

There were 6,950 households, out of which 34.0% had children under the age of 18 living with them, 53.5% were married couples living together, 12.7% had a female householder with no husband present, and 30.5% were non-families. 24.2% of all households were made up of individuals, and 6.5% had someone living alone who was 65 years of age or older. The average household size was 2.51 and the average family size was 3.00.

In the town, the population was spread out, with 25.0% under the age of 18, 7.9% from 18 to 24, 33.6% from 25 to 44, 22.6% from 45 to 64, and 10.9% who were 65 years of age or older. The median age was 36 years. For every 100 females, there were 93.5 males. For every 100 females age 18 and over, there were 89.2 males.

The median income for a household in the town was $47,380, and the median income for a family was $58,302. Males had a median income of $37,359 versus $29,805 for females. The per capita income for the town was $22,433. About 4.9% of families and 6.8% of the population were below the poverty line, including 8.9% of those under age 18 and 10.1% of those age 65 or over.

History

Land near the town of Garner was first settled around 1751. In the 1850s, the North Carolina Railroad was built, and before the 1870s, a wood-and-water stop was established in present-day downtown Garner. The community of Garner's Station received a post office in 1878 and was incorporated in 1883, but the community had its charter repealed in 1891.

In 1905, the charter was reinstated as the Town of Garner.  The first mayor was J.B. Richardson, and the first aldermen were H.D. Rand, J.J. Bagwell, H. Bryan, M.C. Penny, and J.S. Buffaloe.

In 1912, the telephone came to Garner.  The town is off of US 70, which in 1917 became the first paved highway to be built in North Carolina. An explosion and partial roof collapse of a ConAgra Foods plant on June 9, 2009, killed four and injured some 40 workers.

The Downtown Garner Historic District, Edenwood, and Meadowbrook Country Club are listed on the National Register of Historic Places.

Government

City Council and City Manager
Garner currently operates under a council–manager government whereby the Town Council is the publicly elected legislative body of the town, and appoints a Town Manager to manage the administrative operations of the town.  The Town Council consists of the Mayor and five Town Council Members, one of whom serves as Mayor "Pro Tempore."

 Ken Marshburn, Mayor
 Kathy Behringer, Council Member, Mayor Pro-Tem
 Demian Dellinger, Council Member
 Phil Matthews, Council Member
 Gra Singleton, Council Member
 Elmo Vance, Council Member

Since March 2016, Rodney Dickerson has served as the Town Manager.

City Police Department
As of 2019, the Garner Police Department has 68 sworn police officers and 10 professional staff personnel (including full-time and part-time staff) to provide law enforcement services to a town roughly 16 square miles in area with a permanent residential population of over 31,000 citizens. The Department is divided into two bureaus—the Operations Bureau and the Administration Bureau.

Since October 2020, Joe Binns has served as Garner's Chief of Police.

Library

Garner's library service began in 1928 and was formed by the Garner's Women's Club, which operated and staffed the library with volunteer workers 

Today, Garner's public library is the Southeast Regional Library, which is a regional facility operated by Wake County Public Libraries. The library offers Wake County Public Library's child and adult services, which include storytimes, adult craft programs, computer use, and other free activities for the community. In 2020, as part of Wake County Public Library's Fine Free program, Southeast Regional Library has stopped collecting fines for books that are returned late. 

In June 2020, Southeast Regional Library began offering Wake County's Books on the Go program, a contactless book retrieval service that allows patrons to request and receive books from the library while it is closed due to COVID-19

Employment 
According to Garner's 2020 Comprehensive Annual Financial Report, the top employers in the town were:

In 2020, Amazon began operations at a new Fulfillment Center in Garner and is expected to hire 3,000 full time employees.

Transportation

Roads 

Several major roads and highways serve Garner:

Interstate 40 passes by the north and east sides of Garner.  The town can be accessed via South Saunders Street (Exit 298-A), Hammond Road (Exit 299), Jones Sausage Road (Exit 303), or US 70 (Exit 306-B).
U.S. 70 serves as the main east–west highway through Garner.  Most of the businesses and shopping centers lie on U.S. 70.
U.S. 401 splits from U.S. 70 at the town's northwestern corner and runs to the west of the town.
N.C. 50 enters the town with U.S. 401 and U.S. 70 at the northwestern corner, then splits from U.S. 70 at Benson Road, serving as a major north–south arterial through Garner, and paralleling I-40 into Johnston County.
N.C. 42 is an east–west highway south of Garner.  Though outside of the town limits proper, it serves many addresses in unincorporated parts of Wake and Johnston counties with Garner addresses.
Timber Drive is an extension of Hammond Road that serves as a major arterial to connect residential areas of Garner with U.S. 70 and I-40.
Garner Road is a former alignment of U.S. 70 that parallels it along the town's northern edge.

Public transportation 

Garner is served by the GoRaleigh bus routes 7 and 40x, both serving the shopping centers around Garner Station. In October 2019, GoRaleigh bus route 20 replaced the rush-hour-only service of GoTriangle bus route 102 with all-day service. Route 20 connects Downtown Garner with Downtown Raleigh as well as the shopping centers at White Oak, Timber Crossing, and Forest Hills, the Garner Town Hall, the Southeast Regional Library, and the Garner Police Station.

Addition service is provided to seniors and those with disabilities through GoWake Access. This service provides door-to-door service to eligible residents that may have difficulties using traditional public transportation.

Rail 

Amtrak passes through Garner but does not have a scheduled stop; the nearest station is Raleigh Union Station.

Air 

The nearest commercial airport with regular passenger service is Raleigh-Durham International Airport.  General aviation services can also be found at the Triple W Airport in Fuquay-Varina or the Raleigh East Airport in Knightdale.

Education
The following schools serve students in and around Garner.  Most, but not all, are located within the town limits of Garner.  With few exceptions, school districts in North Carolina are organized at the county level, and students are often assigned to schools without regard to which municipality they live in.

Wake County public schools:
 Aversboro Elementary School
 Bryan Road Elementary School
 Creech Road Elementary School
 East Garner Elementary School
 Rand Road Elementary School
 Smith Magnet Elementary School
 Timber Drive Elementary School
 Vandora Springs Elementary School
 Vance Elementary School
 East Garner Middle School
 North Garner Middle School
 Garner Magnet High School
South Garner High School

Johnston County public schools:
 Polenta Elementary School
 West View Elementary School
 Cleveland Middle School

The original campus of the Governor Morehead School, a state-operated school for blind white students and blind and deaf black students, was in Garner. In 1923 white blind students were moved to Raleigh. The desegregation plan in the 1960s called for all deaf students to be moved to North Carolina School for the Deaf and Eastern North Carolina School for the Deaf, while blind students were moved to Raleigh.

Notable people
 Brandon Banks, Canadian Football League wide receiver and return specialist
 Chris Culliver, NFL cornerback
 Carl Franks, former Duke University head football coach and former University of South Florida assistant coach
 Tom Gulley, former MLB player
 Donnie Harrison, former sheriff of Wake County, North Carolina
 Nyheim Hines, NFL running back
 Arlie Honeycutt, Miss North Carolina 2012
 James Mays, professional basketball player
 Scotty McCreery, American Idol season 10 winner
 Manny Perez, professional soccer player
 Sarah Shook, country music singer
 John Wall, NBA player
 Pat Watkins, MLB outfielder
 David West, NBA player and 2003 NCAA Player-of-the-Year at Xavier University
 Donald Williams, professional basketball player

References

External links
 Town of Garner official website
 Garner Chamber of Commerce
 Garner Parks and Recreation

Populated places established in 1847
Towns in North Carolina
Towns in Wake County, North Carolina
1847 establishments in North Carolina